Robert Adol'fovich Minlos (28 February 1931  – 9 January 2018) was a Soviet and Russian mathematician who has made important contributions to probability theory and mathematical physics. His theorem on the extension of cylindrical measures to Radon measures on the continuous dual of a nuclear space is of fundamental importance in the theory of generalized random processes.

He died on 9 January 2018 at the age of 86.

References

External links
 
 List of publications on  mathnet.ru

1931 births
2018 deaths
Mathematicians from Moscow
Soviet mathematicians
Moscow State University alumni
Academic staff of Moscow State University